Daniel Ohene Darko (born Sunday 18 June 1961) is a Ghanaian politician who currently serves as the Member of Parliament for the Upper Denkyira West Constituency.

Early life and education 
Daniel Ohene Darko was born on 18 June 1961 and hails from Ayanfuri in the Central Region of Ghana. He obtained his Senior Secondary Certificate Examination (SSCE) in 1977. He also obtained his Ordinary Level in 1977 and Advanced Level in 1983. He proceeded in having his Bachelor of Laws (Law) from 2001 to 2003, Barrister of Law in 2003 and Executive Master of Business Administration(EMBA) – Marketing in 2011.

Career 
Daniel Ohene Darko worked as an Associate of a Law Firm "Kwasi Blay and Associates" in Ghana. He again worked at Amicus Legal Consult (Partner) in Ghana. He is the Managing Partner of Betta Law Consult. He is currently working as the Member of Parliament (MP) for Upper Denkyira West Constituency in the Central Region of Ghana on the ticket of the National Democratic Congress.

Political life 
Daniel Ohene Darko contested and won the NDC parliamentary primaries for Upper Denkyira West Constituency in the Central Region of Ghana. He won the Upper Denkyira West Constituency parliamentary seat in the 2020 Ghanaian general elections on the ticket of the National Democratic Congress with 18,446 votes making 50.7% of the total votes cast to join the Eighth (8th) Parliament of the Fourth Republic of Ghana against Samuel Nsowah-Djan of the New Patriotic Party who had 17,925 votes making 49.3% of the total votes cast.

Committees 
Daniel Ohene Darko is a member of the Youth, Sports and Culture Committee and also a member of the Poverty Reduction Strategy  Committee.

Personal life 
Daniel Ohene Darko is a Christian.

References 

Living people
1961 births
National Democratic Congress (Ghana) politicians
Ghanaian MPs 2021–2025
People from Central Region (Ghana)
Ghanaian lawyers